Sigune may refer to:
Sigune, cousin of Parzival in Arthurian legend
 502 Sigune, minor planet